It's Later Than It's Ever Been is the fourth album of Christian rock band Smalltown Poets. It was released in 2004.

Track listing
All the songs written by Goldman, Johnston and Peterson, except where noted:
 "The Truth Is Out" (Goldman, Johnston, Peterson, Stains) - 3:42
 "Show Me Who You Are" (Goldman, Johnston, Peterson, Stains) - 4:07
 "Upside Down" - 4:06
 "There on the Sun" (Goldman, Johnston, Peterson, Weaver) - 3:44
 "Lay It Down" (Goldman, Johnston, Peterson, Weaver) - 4:21
 "Here" - 3:37
 "A New Beginning" (Goldman, Johnston, Peterson, Stains) - 4:29
 "New to Me" - 3:28
 "We Will Continue" - 3:31
 "Love So Divine" - 9:52

Personnel
Michael Johnston - vocals, guitars
Troy Stains - guitars
Alex Peterson - bass guitar 
Matt Goldman - drums

Smalltown Poets albums
2004 albums